Catopuma is a genus of felid containing two small wild cat species, the Asian golden cat (C. temminckii) and the bay cat (C. badia). Together with the genus Pardofelis it forms the bay cat lineage of felines.
Both are typically reddish brown in colour, with darker markings on the head.

The two species diverged from one another 4.9-5.3 million years ago, long before Borneo separated from the neighboring islands. Their closest living relative is the marbled cat (Pardofelis marmorata), from which the common ancestor of the genus Catopuma diverged around 9.4 million years ago.

Taxonomy
The name Catopuma was proposed by Nikolai Severtzov in 1858 with Felis moormensis as type species, which was described by Brian Houghton Hodgson.

References

Felines
Mammal genera
Taxa named by Nikolai Severtzov

fr:Catopuma